Nikolai Gennadyevich Ronzhin (born 18 September 1980) is a Russian professional football coach and a former player.

Club career
He made his Russian Football National League debut for FC Gazovik-Gazprom Izhevsk on 1 July 2000 in a game against PFC Spartak Nalchik.

External links
 

1980 births
Living people
Russian footballers
Association football defenders
Russian football managers
FC Yenisey Krasnoyarsk players
FC Neftekhimik Nizhnekamsk players
FC Izhevsk players
FC Zenit-Izhevsk players